Bagh-e Bala (also Romanized as Bāgh-e Bālā and Bāgh Bālā) is a village in Rud Ab-e Gharbi Rural District, Rud Ab District, Narmashir County, Kerman Province, Iran. At the 2006 census, its population was 884, in 193 families.

References 

Populated places in Narmashir County